This is a list of Chinese national-type primary schools (SJK(C)) in the Federal Territories, Malaysia. As of June 2022, there are 44 Chinese primary schools with a total of 44,018 students. There are 42 Chinese primary schools in Kuala Lumpur and two in Labuan. There are currently no Chinese schools in Putrajaya.

List of Chinese national-type primary schools in the Federal Territories

Kuala Lumpur

Labuan

See also 

 Lists of Chinese national-type primary schools in Malaysia

References

 
Schools in Kuala Lumpur
.Federal Territories
Chinese-language schools in Malaysia
Schools in Labuan